Pejagan-Pemalang Toll Road is a toll road stretching  that links Pejagan, Brebes, to Pemalang, Central Java, in Indonesia. This toll road is a continuation of the Kanci-Pejagan Toll Road and part of Trans-Java Toll Road. The toll road was fully opened on November 9, 2018 by 7th President of Indonesia Joko Widodo.

Sections
The toll road project started with groundbreaking by Public Works Minister Djoko Kirmanto on July 23, 2014. Its section I and section II was inaugurated by 7th President of Indonesia Joko Widodo on June 16, 2016. Section III (East Brebes–Tegal) and IV (Tegal–Pemalang) of the toll road were targeted to be completed by March 2018. The toll is divided into four sections:

Toll gate
Note: The number on the exits is based on the distance from the western terminus of the Jakarta-Cikampek Toll Road, while the distance numbers are based on the distance from the western terminus of this toll road only

See also
 Brebes Exit, a toll exit within the toll road known for its 2016 deadly incident

References

Toll roads in Indonesia
Transport in West Java
Cirebon Regency
Transport in Central Java